Farley Halt railway station was a station in Farley to the north of  Much Wenlock, Shropshire, England. The station was opened in 1934 and closed in 1962. It had a short timber edged platform with a wooden shelter on the west side of the line behind the former Rock House Inn. The halt could be accessed by steps down from a road over bridge to the south. On the other side of the over bridge was an access siding to Bradley Rock Quarry. The halt has been demolished, but its nameboard can be found displayed 400 metres to the north of the site on a stone barn adjacent to the A4169 Much Wenlock Road.

References

Further reading

Disused railway stations in Shropshire
Railway stations in Great Britain opened in 1934
Railway stations in Great Britain closed in 1962
Former Great Western Railway stations